this will be the 24th edition of Kuwait Crown Prince Cup where the 15 teams are split into 2 groups where top 2 from each group advance to the final.

Al-Salmiya SC are the defending champions.

Group-Stage

Group A

Group B

Ref:

Knockouts

Matches

Semi-finals

Final
2016–17 Kuwait Crown Prince Cup Final

References

External links

Kuwait Crown Prince Cup
Kuwait Crown Prince Cup
Crown Prince Cup